is a Japanese chess player who holds the title of FIDE master.  He won the 40th Japanese Chess Championship in May 2007 and became the youngest ever national champion (16 years, 18 days old). He also played for Japan at the 38th Chess Olympiad in November 2008 and became co-champion of the U.S. National High School Championship in April 2010.

Uesugi moved to the United States in March 2000. He graduated from Winston Churchill High School (Potomac, Maryland) in June 2010 and University of California, Berkeley in May 2014.

Chess major achievements

World 

 Chess Olympiad Player represented Japan for 38th Chess Olympiad, Dresden, Germany - November 2008
 World Youth Olympic, Singapore - August 2007
 World Junior Chess Championship, Istanbul, Turkey - November 2005

United States 

 National High School Co-Champion, Columbus, OH - April 2010
 National High School Bughouse Chess Champion, Columbus, OH - April 2010
 Springfield Open Co-Champion, Springfield, VA - January 2010
 United States Chess League Player at Baltimore Kingfishers - AUG-NOV 2009
 UMBC Championship Co-Champion, Catonsville, MD - September 2009
 US NO.1 ranking among age 18, June 2009
 40th Virginia Open Champion, Springfield, VA - January 2008
 National Scholastic Champion of Grade 10, Houston, TX - December 2007
 National Scholastic Champion of Grade 9, Lake Buena Vista, FL - December 2006
 Winner of Sweet 16 Invitation only Maryland Scholastic Championship to determine University of Maryland, Baltimore County (2009 US NO.1 Chess University) Chess Scholar awarded full tuition scholarship for UMBC in Grade 7, Catonsville, MD - March 2005

Japan 

 Golden Open Champion, Tokyo, Japan - May 2015
 New Year Open Champion, Tokyo, Japan - January 2013
 Christmas Open Champion, Tokyo, Japan - December 2012
 Three times Japan Summer Open Champion, Tokyo, Japan - July 2008, July 2009, July 2012
 2010-2011 Most Promising Youth Award for the coming Olympics and International Championships by Japanese Olympic Committee
 2009-2010 Most Promising Youth Award for the coming Olympics and International Championships by Japanese Olympic Committee
 Three times Japan Junior Champion and Junior Olympic Cup winner, Tokyo, Japan - July 2007, July 2008, July 2009
 Japan Youngest ever National Champion, Tokyo, Japan - May 2007

Other sports 

In November 2010, Shinsaku won the UC Berkeley Canasta tournament with Ted Sanders. As of February 2011, Shinsaku Uesugi is UC Berkeley's second highest rated Canasta player.

Shinsaku also played for the UC Berkeley badminton team.

References

Media articles 
 Future Stars in the Spotlight at Three Student Tournaments by New York Times on May 1, 2010
 High School Nationals: The Biggest Tie Ever and Hunter on Top by United States Chess Federation on April 19, 2010
 Columbus, Ryba Wins Blitz, Low and Uesgui Take Bug by United States Chess Federation on April 16, 2010
 Schools Recognize Benefits of Chess(YouTube)　by Voice of America on November 26, 2008
  Erenburg and Stripunsky Take Atlantic  by United States Chess Federation on May 1, 2008
 Uesugi, Lu tie at Open by The Washington Times on February 9, 2008
 Searching for Bobby Fischer in Potomac?　by The Connection on July 17, 2007
 Triumph in Tokyo　by Potomac Almanac on May 15, 2007
Chess scores middle-schooler scholarship  by Gazette.net on February 22, 2006
A Knight among Chess Players  by Gazette.net on January 14, 2004

External links 
 
 
 
 

1991 births
Living people
Japanese chess players
Chess FIDE Masters
University of California, Berkeley alumni
Sportspeople from Kyoto
Japanese expatriates in the United States
People from Potomac, Maryland